William Michael Thomas Henry (born 6 July 1998) is an English professional goalkeeper who currently plays for National League South club Chippenham Town.

Club career
Henry began his career as a youth team goalkeeper with Bristol City before moving to the youth set-up at Swindon Town.

In October 2015, Henry joined Shrivenham on loan and made his debut in the Berks & Bucks Senior Cup win against East Hendred. On 30 April 2016, Henry made his professional debut for Swindon Town in the 2–2 draw at Rochdale and saved a first half Ian Henderson penalty. On 8 September 2017, Henry joined Southern League Premier Division side Dunstable Town on a one-month loan deal. A day later, Henry made his debut in their 8–1 away defeat against Slough Town.

On 5 February 2018, Henry joined National League South side Hampton & Richmond Borough on loan for the remainder of the campaign. After appearing four times, Swindon recalled Henry, following the arrival of new manager, Phil Brown.

On 9 August 2018, following the arrival of Luke McCormick, Henry was sent out on loan to National League South, Chippenham Town on a one-month loan. He went onto make six league appearances.

On 9 November 2018, Henry joined local rivals, Swindon Supermarine on a one-month loan and made his debut a day later, during a 2–1 defeat to Staines Town. On 7 December, it was announced that Henry's loan would be renewed for a further month. Four days after his loan expired, he returned to Supermarine on a deal until mid-February 2019 following the red card and suspension of Martin Horsell.

He was offered a new contract by Swindon at the end of the 2018–19 season.

Henry was released at the end of the 2019–20 season.
Henry joined National League South, side Bath City in September 2020

Henry joined National League South, side Chippenham Town in June 2021

International career
On 28 September 2017, Henry received his first international call-up for the England U20 squad by manager Keith Downing for their fixtures against Italy U20 and Czech Republic U20.

Career statistics

References

External links

England profile at The Football Association

1998 births
Living people
English footballers
Association football goalkeepers
Bristol City F.C. players
Swindon Town F.C. players
Shrivenham F.C. players
Dunstable Town F.C. players
Hampton & Richmond Borough F.C. players
Chippenham Town F.C. players
Swindon Supermarine F.C. players
Gloucester City A.F.C. players
Hereford F.C. players
Hungerford Town F.C. players
Bath City F.C. players
English Football League players
Southern Football League players
National League (English football) players
Footballers from Bristol